William Webster Franklin (born December 13, 1941) is an American lawyer, politician, and jurist from Mississippi. As a Republican, he served in the United States House of Representatives representing Mississippi's 2nd congressional district from 1983 to 1987.

Biography
Born in Greenwood in Leflore County on the eastern edge of the Mississippi Delta, Franklin graduated from Greenwood High School. In 1963, he received a Bachelor of Arts degree from Mississippi State University at Starkville. In 1966, he received his LL.B. and Juris Doctor from the University of Mississippi School of Law at Oxford and was admitted to the bar. He attended The JAG School at the University of Virginia and entered U.S. Army JAG Corps. From 1963 to 1970, he was a major in the United States Army. In 1966, he was a member of the Army's Judge Advocate General's Corps.

Franklin practiced law in Greenwood from 1970 to 1972, when he became as assistant district attorney for the state Fourth Circuit District Court. In 1978, he was elected circuit judge for the Fourth District and remained in that office until 1982, when he was elected to Congress. He was defeated in 1986 in his bid for a third term by African-American Democrat Mike Espy. Upon leaving the U.S. House, Franklin returned to Greenwood to practice law.

References

1941 births
Living people
Mississippi state court judges
Mississippi lawyers
United States Army officers
United States Army Judge Advocate General's Corps
University of Mississippi School of Law alumni
Mississippi State University alumni
People from Greenwood, Mississippi
Republican Party members of the United States House of Representatives from Mississippi
The Judge Advocate General's Legal Center and School alumni